MF Tysnes is a Norwegian car and passenger ferry in operation in Hardangerfjord since 1970.

Ship history
The vessel was built by Haugesund Slip AS in Haugesund in 1970 for the Hardanger Sunnhordlandske Dampskipsselskap ("Hardanger-Sunnhordland Steamship Company"). Since then it has operated almost entirely between the villages of Kinsarvik, Utne and Kvanndal. In 2006 HSD merged with Gaia Trafikk forming a new company called Tide. The company ferry section changed its name to Norled in 2012.

See also
  
 Transport in Norway

References

 

1970 ships
Ships built in Norway
Ferries of Norway
Merchant ships of Norway